The Philippine bush warbler (Horornis seebohmi), also known as the Luzon bush warbler,  is a species of bird in the family Cettiidae.
It was formerly conspecific with the Japanese bush warbler. It is found only in the Philippines in the Cordillera Mountain Range of northern Luzon. It is found in tropical montane forest.

Description 
EBird describes the bird as "A small drab bird of dense undergrowth within open montane forest in northern Luzon. Warm brown on the upperparts and crown with a dark eye-stripe and pale brown underparts blending to a pale gray chest and whitish throat. Similar to Long-tailed bush warbler, but tail shorter and underparts grayish rather than deep brown. Also similar to Benguet bush warbler, but has a more distinct pale eyebrow. Song consists of a drawn-out low whistle followed by an explosive whistled phrase. Call is a sharp “tsik!"

Habitat and Conservation Status 
It is found in tropical montane pine forests above 800 meters in elevation. It is typically found in the understory and low thickets in the forest strata. Little else is known about this bird.

IUCN has assessed this bird as least-concern with the population believed to be stable but more surveys are needed to determine the actual population health and distribution of the species.

References

Horornis
Birds described in 1894
Taxa named by William Robert Ogilvie-Grant
Taxonomy articles created by Polbot